Vipera berus sachalinensis (Sakhalin Island adder  a.k.a. Sakhalin adder) is a viper subspecies endemic to Asia. Like all other vipers, it is venomous.

Geographic range
It is found in the Russian Far East (Amur), China (Jilin), North Korea, and on Sakhalin Island.

According to Schwarz (1936), the type locality is "Sachalin" (= Sakhalin Island, Russia).

Taxonomy
McDiarmid et al. (1999) follow Golay et al. (1993) and recognize V. b. sachalinensis as a subspecies of V. berus. However, it has been considered a full species in recent literature.

References

Further reading
Golay P, Smith HM, Broadley DG, Dixon JR, McCarthy CJ, Rage J-C, Schätti B, Toriba M. 1993. Endoglyphs and Other Major Venomous Snakes of the World. A Checklist. Geneva: Azemiops. 478 pp.
Schwarz, Ernst. 1936. Untersuchungen über Systematik und Verbreitung der europäischen und mediterranen Otter. In: Die europäischen und mediterranen Ottern und ihre Gifte. Behringwerk-Mitteilungen 7: 159-362.
Zarevskij, Sergei Fedorovich. 1917. [New Forms of the Genus Vipera found in the Russian Empire: Vipera tigrina, new species, and Vipera berus var. sachalinensis, new variation?]. [Annals of the Museum of Zoology of the Academy of Sciences, Petrograd ] 21: 37. (in Russian).

External links
 

berus sachalinensis
Reptiles described in 1917